Seppo Kuusisto (13 November 1945 – 3 January 2005) was a Finnish historian and Estophile.

He was the head of Tuglas Society.

In 2001, he was awarded with Order of the Cross of Terra Mariana, IV Class.

References

1945 births
2005 deaths
20th-century Finnish historians
Estophiles